Youth in Oregon is a 2016 American comedy-drama film directed by Joel David Moore and starring Frank Langella, Billy Crudup, Christina Applegate, Nicola Peltz, Mary Kay Place, and Josh Lucas.

The film had its world premiere at the Tribeca Film Festival on April 16, 2016. The film was released in theaters on February 3, 2017, by Orion Pictures and Samuel Goldwyn Films.

Premise
A man is tasked with driving his embittered 80-year-old father-in-law cross country to be legally euthanized in Oregon, while along the way helping him rediscover a reason for living.

Cast
 Frank Langella as Raymond Engersol
 Billy Crudup as Brian Gleason
 Christina Applegate as Kate Gleason
 Nicola Peltz as Annie Gleason
 Mary Kay Place as Estelle Engersol
 Josh Lucas as Danny Engersol
 Alex Shaffer as Nick Gleason

Production
The project was announced in April 2014, with the hiring of Joel David Moore to direct a script by Andrew Eisen. In March 2015, Frank Langella was cast in the film's leading role. The Hollywood Reporter announced that Billy Crudup had joined the cast in May 2015. In June 2015, it was reported that Christina Applegate would co-star. That same month, Josh Lucas was cast in the film. In early July 2015, Nicola Peltz was cast to portray the daughter of Crudup and Applegate.

Principal photography began on June 20, 2015, in New York City. Filming concluded on July 20, 2015.

Release
The film had its world premiere at the Tribeca Film Festival on April 16, 2016. Shortly after, Orion Pictures and Samuel Goldwyn Films acquired distribution rights and set the film for a February 3, 2017, release.

References

External links
 
 

2016 films
2016 comedy-drama films
2010s English-language films
2010s road comedy-drama films
American road comedy-drama films
Films scored by Joel P. West
Films set in Oregon
Films shot in New York (state)
Orion Pictures films
Samuel Goldwyn Films films
2010s American films